The Nativity film series is a British film series of family Christmas films.

Films

Released films

Nativity! (2009)

Paul Maddens is a teacher who once had ambitions of being successful as an actor, producer or director. Every year St Bernadette's Primary School in Coventry, where he teaches, competes with a local private school.

Despite this, St Bernadette's headteacher Mrs Bevans tasks him with running their nativity play this year and gives him a new class teaching assistant called Mr Poppy, who turns out to be as much of a child as the rest of Paul's class. As every year, it is one of Paul's other friends from drama school, Gordon Shakespeare, who runs the nativity plays at rival school Oakmoor.

Determined not to be seen as a failure by his old rival, Paul lies to Shakespeare about how a Hollywood producer, their old friend Jennifer, will be turning his production into a Hollywood film, though he has not even spoken to her in five years. Mr Poppy accidentally overhears this and is so excited that he has to spread the rumour.

Soon, Paul finds his lie is out of control, and all he can do is go along with it as media attention mounts and the children get more and more excited, so Paul has to try to actually get Hollywood to turn their production into a film.

Danger in the Manger (2012)

Donald Peterson is an anxious teacher who has just moved to a new house with his pregnant wife Sarah. He accepts a teaching job at St. Bernadette's Primary School, taking over the class formerly taught by Mr Maddens, who by this point has left for the United States. In the interim, the enthusiastic and childlike teaching assistant Mr Poppy has been teaching the class unaided.

The class wants to enter a competition called "A Song for Christmas", in which each school produces a Christmas song, with the winning song earning its school £10,000 and the chance at being a Christmas #1. However, headteacher Mrs Bevan refuses the class permission to enter without a qualified teacher and worries that Mr Poppy's behaviour is so inappropriate that no teacher will stay on the job.

When Mr Poppy decides St Bernadette's should enter the National 'Song for Christmas' competition, he persuades Donald to sign the entry forms, later kidnapping him for an impromptu road trip to Gastell Llawen ("Merry Castle", not a real place) in Wales, where the competition is being held.

Dude, Where's My Donkey? (2014)

This movie stars Martin Clunes, Marc Wootton, Catherine Tate with Celia Imrie and Jason Watkins.

At St. Bernadette’s school, Mr Poppy and the kids sign up to do a Flashmob in a Flashmob competition hosted by the famous Flashmobber, Bradley Finch, the winning prize will go to New York to dance on the Empire States Building.

Jeremy Shepherd is a super teacher (as Desmond Poppy thinks he is) who is the father of Lauren and is due to marry his fiancée Sophie in New York on Christmas Eve. However, Shepard is hit in the forehead by Mr Poppy's pet donkey Archie, which loses his memory.

As Shepard loses his memory, Lauren wish was to make Shepard marry Sophie, by Mr Poppy and the kids help Lauren by her Christmas wish, they helping Shepard get his memory back by his Christmas past, getting to New York until Shepard takes a walk around New York...

Nativity Rocks! (2018)

It was confirmed on 4 December 2017 that Nativity 4 would be released on Friday 23 November 2018, and would be entitled Nativity Rocks!. A teaser trailer was released in July 2018. Casting included; Simon Lipkin, Daniel Boys, Craig Revel Horwood, Meera Syal, Helen George, Ruth Jones, Celia Imrie, Hugh Dennis, Anna Chancellor, Ramin Karimloo, as well as some of the cast from the original theatre musical cast.

Doru, a child refugee from Syria, is separated from his father as he arrives in the United Kingdom. He is moved to Coventry by social worker Miss Shelly and joins St Bernadette's Primary School, where he meets a new teaching assistant, Jerry Poppy, who assists him in his search for his father amid another Christmas musical production for the school, led by impresario Emmanuel Cavendish.

Future

Possible future films 
In an interview, Debbie Isitt said "Nativity 4 has been developed already and so has Nativity 5 – one of them is set ‘Down Under’ in Australia". She later added "However, I am uncertain as to if or when they will be made as there are other projects competing for my attention. We will just have to see." The fourth film was released in 2018, no comment has been made on a potential fifth film since its release.

Declined international remakes
Producer Nick Jones revealed that they had so far "politely declined" offers to make American and Australian remakes.

Cast

Crew

Stage musical 

A stage musical adaptation of the first film written and directed by Debbie Isitt and composed by Nicky Ager opened at the Birmingham Repertory Theatre in October 2017. Since its world premiere the musical has toured the UK over the Christmas seasons, including runs at London's Hammersmith Apollo which have featured guest star celebrities such as Louis Walsh, Danny Dyer, Dani Dyer, Jo Brand, Rylan Clark-Neal and Sharon Osbourne.

Reception

Box office performance

Critical  response

References

British Christmas films
British film series
Tetralogies